Elachista conidia is a moth of the family Elachistidae that is found in California, United States.

The ground color of the forewings is light gray, densely dusted with dark brown tips of scales that also form an indistinct spot before the middle and another similar spot at two-thirds of the wing. The hindwings are light gray and the underside of the wings is brownish gray.

Etymology
The species name is derived from Greek konis (meaning dust).

References

conidia
Endemic fauna of California
Moths of North America
Moths described in 1997
Fauna without expected TNC conservation status